Hatay Büyükşehir Belediyesi Womens is the women's football section of Hatay Büyükşehir Belediyespor, a major sports club in Hatay, Turkey. The team competes in Turkish Women's Football Third League.

Statistics

Notes:
^ Six penalty points  were deducted by the Turkish Football Federation

References

External links 

Sport in Antakya
Women's football clubs in Turkey
Football clubs in Hatay